Baptiste Planckaert (born 28 September 1988 in Kortrijk) is a Belgian cyclist, who currently rides for UCI WorldTeam . In May 2018, he was named in the startlist for the Giro d'Italia, where he finished 116th overall.

Personal life
Planckaert, along with his brothers Edward Planckaert and Emiel Planckaert, are all professional cyclists.

Major results

2005
 4th Paris–Roubaix Juniors
2006
 10th Paris–Roubaix Juniors
2009
 1st Polynormande
 1st Stage 3 Le Triptyque des Monts et Châteaux
 2nd Kattekoers
 3rd Brussels-Opwijk
 4th Grand Prix Criquielion
 7th Grote 1-MeiPrijs
 8th De Vlaamse Pijl
 9th La Côte Picarde
2010
 2nd Omloop van het Waasland
 3rd De Vlaamse Pijl
 5th Tour de Vendée
2011
 8th Grote Prijs Stad Zottegem
2012
 3rd Grote 1-MeiPrijs
 3rd Grote Prijs Jean-Pierre Monseré
 4th Grand Prix de Fourmies
 8th Châteauroux Classic
 10th Nokere Koerse
2013
 2nd Kampioenschap van Vlaanderen
 3rd Schaal Sels
 6th Gooikse Pijl
 6th De Kustpijl
2014
 2nd Grand Prix d'Ouverture La Marseillaise
 2nd Ronde Pévéloise
 4th Paris–Bourges
 5th Halle–Ingooigem
 6th Grand Prix de Fourmies
 7th Châteauroux Classic
 8th Ronde van Limburg
 10th Grand Prix de la ville de Pérenchies
 10th Grand Prix d'Isbergues
2015
 1st Kattekoers
 1st  Points classification Tour du Limousin
 3rd Cholet-Pays de Loire
 4th Grand Prix de Fourmies
 4th Grand Prix d'Isbergues
 4th Grand Prix d'Ouverture La Marseillaise
 4th La Roue Tourangelle
 5th Overall Tour du Haut Var
 5th Overall Circuit des Ardennes
1st  Points classification
 5th Tour de Vendée
 5th Nokere Koerse
 5th Boucles de l'Aulne
 7th Polynormande
 7th Route Adélie
 9th Le Samyn
2016
 1st Overall UCI Europe Tour
 1st  Overall Tour de Normandie
1st Stage 5
 1st Tour du Finistère
 1st Polynormande
 1st Stage 4 Czech Cycling Tour
 1st  Mountains classification Tour de Wallonie
 2nd Overall Circuit des Ardennes
1st  Points classification
 2nd Tour du Doubs
 2nd Cholet-Pays de Loire
 2nd Paris–Troyes
 3rd Grand Prix d'Isbergues
 3rd Grand Prix d'Ouverture La Marseillaise
 4th Grand Prix de Denain
 4th Nokere Koerse
 4th Grand Prix de la Somme
 4th Internationale Wielertrofee Jong Maar Moedig
 4th Omloop Mandel-Leie-Schelde
 4th Schaal Sels
 5th Overall Tour of Belgium
1st  Points classification
 5th Paris–Camembert
 5th La Roue Tourangelle
 5th Tour de Vendée
 6th Ronde van Limburg
 6th Grote Prijs Stad Zottegem
 7th Tro-Bro Léon
 7th Route Adélie
 7th Grand Prix de Wallonie
 7th Nationale Sluitingsprijs
 10th Grand Prix de Fourmies
2017
 4th Handzame Classic
 5th Vuelta a Murcia
 6th Clásica de Almería
 6th Grand Prix of Aargau Canton
 6th Omloop Eurometropool
 8th Down Under Classic
 9th Tour de l'Eurométropole
 10th Kuurne–Brussels–Kuurne
2018
 4th Three Days of Bruges–De Panne
 6th Nokere Koerse
 7th Kampioenschap van Vlaanderen
2019
 1st Rund um Köln
 1st  Combativity classification BinckBank Tour
 2nd Tro-Bro Léon
 2nd Circuit de Wallonie
 2nd Famenne Ardenne Classic
 3rd Tour du Finistère
 4th Grote Prijs Marcel Kint
 5th Elfstedenronde
 6th Overall Tour de Luxembourg
 6th Eschborn–Frankfurt
 7th La Roue Tourangelle
 8th Memorial Rik Van Steenbergen
 9th Brussels Cycling Classic
 10th Kampioenschap van Vlaanderen
2020
 1st  Mountains classification Tour de Luxembourg
 3rd Antwerp Port Epic
 9th Tour du Doubs
2021
 3rd Tro-Bro Léon
 5th Tour du Finistère
 6th Kampioenschap van Vlaanderen
 8th Grand Prix de Denain
 10th Grand Prix de Fourmies
2022
 5th Overall Four Days of Dunkirk
 6th Heistse Pijl

Grand Tour general classification results timeline

References

External links

1988 births
Living people
Belgian male cyclists
Sportspeople from Kortrijk
Cyclists from West Flanders